Eugene D. Timms (May 16, 1932 – April 21, 2014) was an American politician and businessman.

Early life and education 
Born in Burns, Oregon, Timms attended Burns High School. He then earned a bachelor's degree in business from Willamette University and served in the United States Army.

Career 
After leaving the military, managed his family's business, a creamery. He later owned and operated Big Country Distributor. Timms served in the Oregon State Senate as a Republican from 1983 to 2001, representing the 30th district. He was an advocate for rural health in Oregon.

Personal life 
Timms and his wife, Edna, had two children and four grandchildren. Timms died in 2014.

References

1932 births
2014 deaths
People from Burns, Oregon
University of Washington alumni
Willamette University alumni
Businesspeople from Oregon
Republican Party Oregon state senators
20th-century American businesspeople